R.A.B. Dikko (1912–1977) was a Nigerian medical doctor who was a former federal commissioner for Mines and Power and was the first medical doctor from Northern Region, Nigeria"

Life
Russel Aliyu Barau Dikko was born in Wusasa, Zaria, a location where Christianity was allowed to flourish in the muslim dominated Zaria emirate". The Christian missionaries were led by a Walter Miller, a young Church Missionary Society missionary doctor, the missionaries built a school, church and hospital in Wusasa. Dikko attended the CMS elementary school in Wusasa and later went to King's College " He then continued his studies at the University of Birmingham.

After finishing his studies, he returned to Nigeria and joined the colonial service as a junior medical officer in 1940. He gradually rose through the ranks of the civil service, becoming a senior medical officer in 1953 and a principal medical officer in the endemic disease division of the Northern Nigeria Ministry of Health in 1960. During the regime of Gen Yakubu Gowon, he was appointed as the Federal Commissioner for Mines and Power in 1967 and Federal Commissioner for Transport in 1971.

Dikko was a founding member of Jamiyar Mutanen Arewa, a Northern Nigeria cultural organization that later formed the nucleus of the Northern People's Congress".
He was educated by the Christian missionary Walter Miller and later married Miller's daughter, Comfort.

References

Nigerian civil servants
Nigerian healthcare managers
Transport ministers of Nigeria
1912 births
1977 deaths
20th-century Nigerian medical doctors
King's College, Lagos alumni